DZIERZYNSKI BITZ (as Dzerzhinski Bitz or simply Dz.Bitz) is a retro/indie band founded by vocalist and main songwriter Wojciech Dzerzhinski. Hailing from Slovakia, Pavlovce-nad-Uhom, the band's unique style is equally influenced by Edward Gil and Syd Barrett, the East-European pre-war music and the British new wave sound. Under The Gun Review recently labelled their sound "multi-instrumental new wave croon pop".

History 
DZIERZYNSKI BITZ's debut album "I II III" was released in June 2012. The core group enlisted the help of fifteen additional musicians to bring their vision to light. The recording of the album began in Russia and was completed in Ukraine before being mixed in London by Joe Hirst (dEUS, Ian Brown, Yasmin). The album's edgy and eccentric modern take on retro influences earned it critically acclaimed.

The band have performed at a host of festivals including Stereoleto, Oasis-fest(Georgia), FORMA, Gogolfest, Koktebel Jazz Festival, AVANT and Krok-Rock. Their live show has earned them strong followings throughout Kyiv, Minsk and Moscow.

The group's latest Release "Podmoskovje / Vziat Siloj" was positively received by both critics and the public. In support of the single in March 2013 was a sold-out mini-tour of the capitals of the surrounding states.

The second longplay Dz.Bitz album Love Me Do was released at November 2014. It was recorded in several studios in Kyiv and Moscow, and produced by Graham Sutton (These New Puritans, Jarvis Cocker). The album expands the band style with the more electronic approach and injection of disco-funk grooves.

The band did a Love Me Do tour in support of its new release in October 2014 at Ukraine, Russia, Baltic countries and Poland.

Members 
 Wojciech Dzierżyński - vocals, percussion
 Sergio Dubček - guitar
 Rámi Kallas - keys
 Konstantin Bukowski - trumpet
 Aleksiej Rudenko - bass
 Krzysztof Grehuta - drums

Discography 
 Albums
 I II III (2012)
 I II III re-mastered (2013)
 Gladiolus EP (2014)
 Love Me Do (2014)
 Novy Twist EP (2015)
 Singles
 Den' / Sex w ZSRR (2010)
 Podmoskovje / Vziat' Siloj (2013)
 Kvity / Virazhy (2014)
 Singapour / Taina (2015)

Music videos
  (2011)
  (2013)
  (2013)
  (2014)
  (2015)

References

External links 
 Official page
 Farfrommoscow

Slovak musical groups